Mount Shasta (Shasta: Waka-nunee-Tuki-wuki; Karuk: Úytaahkoo) is a potentially active volcano at the southern end of the Cascade Range in Siskiyou County, California.
The mountain and surrounding area are part of the Shasta–Trinity National Forest.

Description 
Mount Shasta is connected to its satellite cone of Shastina, and together they dominate the landscape. On a clear winter day, the mountain can be seen from the floor of the Central Valley  to the south. The mountain has attracted the attention of poets, authors, and presidents.

The mountain consists of four overlapping dormant volcanic cones that have built a complex shape, including the main summit and the prominent and visibly conical satellite cone of  Shastina. If Shastina were a separate mountain, it would rank as the fourth-highest peak of the Cascade Range (after Mount Rainier, Rainier's Liberty Cap, and Mount Shasta itself).

Mount Shasta's surface is relatively free of deep glacial erosion except, paradoxically, for its south side where Sargents Ridge runs parallel to the U-shaped Avalanche Gulch. This is the largest glacial valley on the volcano, although it does not now have a glacier in it. There are seven named glaciers on Mount Shasta, with the four largest (Whitney, Bolam, Hotlum, and Wintun) radiating down from high on the main summit cone to below  primarily on the north and east sides. The Whitney Glacier is the longest, and the Hotlum is the most voluminous glacier in the state of California. Three of the smaller named glaciers occupy cirques near and above  on the south and southeast sides, including the Watkins, Konwakiton, and Mud Creek glaciers.

History 
The oldest-known human settlement in the area dates to about 7,000 years ago.

At the time of Euro-American contact in the 1820s, the Native American tribes who lived within view of Mount Shasta included the Shasta, Okwanuchu, Modoc, Achomawi, Atsugewi, Karuk, Klamath, Wintu, and Yana tribes.

A historic eruption of Mount Shasta in 1786 may have been observed by Lapérouse, but this is disputed. Smithsonian Institution's Global Volcanism Program says that the 1786 eruption is discredited, and that the last known eruption of Mount Shasta was around 1250 AD, proved by uncorrected radiocarbon dating.

Although perhaps first seen by Spanish explorers, the first reliably reported land sighting of Mount Shasta by a European or American was by Peter Skene Ogden (a leader of a Hudson's Bay Company trapping brigade) in 1826. In 1827, the name "Sasty" or "Sastise" was given to nearby Mount McLoughlin by Ogden. An 1839 map by David Burr lists the mountain as Rogers Peak. This name was apparently dropped, and the name Shasta was transferred to present-day Mount Shasta in 1841, partly as a result of work by the United States Exploring Expedition.

Beginning in the 1820s, Mount Shasta was a prominent landmark along what became known as the Siskiyou Trail, which runs at Mount Shasta's base. The Siskiyou Trail was on the track of an ancient trade and travel route of Native American footpaths between California's Central Valley and the Pacific Northwest.

The California Gold Rush brought the first Euro-American settlements into the area in the early 1850s, including at Yreka, California and Upper Soda Springs. The first recorded ascent of Mount Shasta occurred in 1854 (by Elias Pearce), after several earlier failed attempts. In 1856, the first women (Harriette Eddy, Mary Campbell McCloud, and their party) reached the summit.

By the 1860s and 1870s, Mount Shasta was the subject of scientific and literary interest. In 1854 John Rollin Ridge titled a poem "Mount Shasta." A book by California pioneer and entrepreneur James Hutchings, titled Scenes of Wonder and Curiosity in California, contained an account of an early summit trip in 1855. The summit was achieved (or nearly so) by John Muir, Josiah Whitney, Clarence King, and John Wesley Powell. In 1877, Muir wrote a dramatic popular article about his surviving an overnight blizzard on Mount Shasta by lying in the hot sulfur springs near the summit. This experience was inspiration to Kim Stanley Robinson's short story "Muir on Shasta".

The 1887 completion of the Central Pacific Railroad, built along the line of the Siskiyou Trail between California and Oregon, brought a substantial increase in tourism, lumbering, and population into the area around Mount Shasta. Early resorts and hotels, such as Shasta Springs and Upper Soda Springs, grew up along the Siskiyou Trail around Mount Shasta, catering to these early adventuresome tourists and mountaineers.

In the early 20th century, the Pacific Highway followed the track of the Siskiyou Trail to the base of Mount Shasta, leading to still more access to the mountain. Today's version of the Siskiyou Trail, Interstate 5, brings thousands of people each year to Mount Shasta.

Mount Shasta was declared a National Natural Landmark in December 1976.

The "Shasta Gulch" is referenced in the lyrics to the 1994 song "Unfair" by cult indie rock band Pavement.

Legends 

The lore of some of the Klamath Tribes in the area held that Mount Shasta is inhabited by the Spirit of the Above-World, Skell, who descended from heaven to the mountain's summit at the request of a Klamath chief. Skell fought with Spirit of the Below-World, Llao, who resided at Mount Mazama by throwing hot rocks and lava, probably representing the volcanic eruptions at both mountains.

Italian settlers arrived in the early 1900s to work in the mills as stonemasons and established a strong Catholic presence in the area. Many other faiths have been attracted to Mount Shasta over the years—more than any other Cascade volcano. Mount Shasta City and Dunsmuir, California, small towns near Shasta's western base, are focal points for many of these, which range from a Buddhist monastery (Shasta Abbey, founded by Houn Jiyu-Kennett in 1971) to modern-day Native American rituals. A group of Native Americans from the McCloud River area practice rituals on the mountain.

Mount Shasta has also been a focus for non-Native American legends, centered on a hidden city of advanced beings from the lost continent of Lemuria. The legend grew from an offhand mention of Lemuria in the 1880s, to a description of a hidden Lemurian village in 1925. In 1931, Harvey Spencer Lewis, using the pseudonym Wishar S[penle] Cerve, wrote Lemuria: the lost continent of the Pacific, published by AMORC, about the hidden Lemurians of Mount Shasta that cemented the legend in many readers' minds.

In August 1987, believers in the spiritual significance of the Harmonic Convergence described Mount Shasta as one of a small number of global "power centers". Mount Shasta remains a focus of "New Age" attention.

Geology 

About 593,000 years ago, andesitic lavas erupted in what is now Mount Shasta's western flank near McBride Spring. Over time, an ancestral Mount Shasta stratovolcano was built to a large but unknown height; sometime between 300,000 and 360,000 years ago the entire north side of the volcano collapsed, creating an enormous landslide or debris avalanche,  in volume. The slide flowed northwestward into Shasta Valley, where the Shasta River now cuts through the  flow.

What remains of the oldest of Mount Shasta's four cones is exposed at Sargents Ridge on the south side of the mountain. Lavas from the Sargents Ridge vent cover the Everitt Hill shield at Mount Shasta's southern foot. The last lavas to erupt from the vent were hornblende-pyroxene andesites with a hornblende dacite dome at its summit. Glacial erosion has since modified its shape.

The next cone to form is exposed south of Mount Shasta's current summit and is called Misery Hill. It was formed 15,000 to 20,000 years ago from pyroxene andesite flows and has since been intruded by a hornblende dacite dome.

There are many buried glacial scars on the mountain that were created in recent glacial periods ("ice ages") of the present Wisconsinian glaciation. Most have since been filled in with andesite lava, pyroclastic flows, and talus from lava domes. Shastina, by comparison, has a fully intact summit crater indicating Shastina developed after the last ice age. Shastina has been built by mostly pyroxene andesite lava flows. The last eruptions formed Shastina's present summit about a hundred years later. But before that, Shastina, along with the then forming Black Butte dacite plug dome complex to the west, created numerous pyroclastic flows that covered , including large parts of what is now Mount Shasta, California and Weed, California.

The last to form, and the highest cone, the Hotlum Cone, formed about 8,000 years ago. It is named after the Hotlum glacier on its northern face; its longest lava flow, the  Military Pass flow, extends  down its northeast face. Since the creation of the Hotlum Cone, a dacite dome intruded the cone and now forms the summit. The rock at the  summit crater has been extensively hydrothermally altered by sulfurous hot springs and fumaroles there (only a few examples still remain).

In the last 8,000 years, the Hotlum Cone has erupted at least eight or nine times. About 200 years ago the last significant Mount Shasta eruption came from this cone and created a pyroclastic flow, a hot lahar (mudflow), and three cold lahars, which streamed  down Mount Shasta's east flank via Ash Creek. A separate hot lahar went  down Mud Creek. This eruption was thought to have been observed by the explorer La Pérouse, from his ship off the California coast, in 1786, but this has been disputed.

Volcanic status 
During the last 10,000 years, Mount Shasta has erupted an average of every 800 years, but in the past 4,500 years the volcano has erupted an average of every 600 years.

USGS seismometers and GPS receivers operated by UNAVCO form the monitoring network for Mount Shasta. The volcano has been relatively quiet for at least the past 15 years, with only a handful of small magnitude earthquakes and no demonstrable ground deformation. Although geophysically quiet, periodic geochemical surveys indicate that volcanic gas emanates from a fumarole at the summit of Mount Shasta from a deep-seated reservoir of partly molten rock.

Mount Shasta can release volcanic ash, pyroclastic flows or dacite and andesite lava. Its deposits can be detected under nearby small towns. Mount Shasta has an explosive, eruptive history. There are fumaroles on the mountain, which show Mount Shasta is still alive.

The worst-case scenario for an eruption is a large pyroclastic flow, similar to that which occurred in the 1980 eruption of Mount St. Helens. Since there is ice, such as Whitney Glacier and Mud Creek Glacier, lahars would also result. Ash would probably blow inland, perhaps as far as eastern Nevada. There is a small chance an eruption could result in a collapse of the mountain, as happened when Mount Mazama in Oregon collapsed to form what is now called Crater Lake, but this is of much lower probability.

The United States Geological Survey monitors Mount Shasta and rates it as a very high-threat volcano.

Climbing 

The summer climbing season runs from late April until October, although many attempts are made in the winter. In winter, Sargents Ridge and Casaval Ridge, to the east and west of Avalanche Gulch, respectively, become the most traveled routes, to avoid avalanche danger. Mount Shasta is also a popular destination for backcountry skiing. Many of the climbing routes can be descended by experienced skiers, and there are numerous lower-angled areas around the base of the mountain.

The Red Banks are the most technical portion of the climb, as they are usually full of snow and ice, are very steep, and top out at around  before the route heads to Misery Hill.
The Casaval Ridge route is a steeper, more technical route on the mountain's southwest ridge best climbed when there is a lot of snow pack. This route tops out to the left (north) of the Red Banks, directly west of Misery Hill. So the final sections involve a trudge up Misery Hill to the summit plateau, similar to the Avalanche Gulch route.

No quota system currently exists for climbing Mount Shasta, and reservations are not required. However, climbers must obtain a summit pass and a wilderness permit to climb the mountain. Permits and passes are available at the ranger station in Mount Shasta and the ranger station in McCloud, or climbers can obtain self-issue permits and passes at any of the trailheads 24 hours a day.

Climbing Mount Shasta can be done in one day; however, it is often completed in two days. Climbers can ascend from Avalanche Gulch and camp at either Horse Camp (elev. ) or Helen Lake (elev. ). Camping at a higher altitude also helps with acclimatization and often reduces the risk of altitude sickness.

See also 
 List of mountain peaks of California
 List of California fourteeners
 List of highest points in California by county
 List of Ultras of the United States
 List of volcanoes in the United States
 Volcanic Legacy Scenic Byway

Notes

References

Sources 
 
 
 
 Lamson, Berenice (1984). "Mount Shasta : a regional history". University of the Pacific Theses and Dissertations: 140.

External links 

 
 
 
 
 
 
 
 

 
Cascade Volcanoes
Fourteeners of California
Mountains of Northern California
Mountains of Siskiyou County, California
National Natural Landmarks in California
Mount Shasta
Mount Shasta
Potentially active volcanoes
Protected areas of Siskiyou County, California
Mount Shasta
Sacred mountains
Shasta-Trinity National Forest
Stratovolcanoes of the United States
Subduction volcanoes
Tourist attractions in Siskiyou County, California
Volcanoes of Siskiyou County, California
Shastan languages
Locations in Native American mythology